The following outline is provided as an overview of and topical guide to the history of the British Isles:

History of the British Isles – history of the European island group known as the British Isles.

Political entities 
Throughout history, various political entities have inhabited the British Isles, with varying degrees of power and independence over one another.

Existing political entities 
 History of Ireland
 History of the United Kingdom - The United Kingdom is a union of different nations:
 History of England
 History of Northern Ireland
 History of Scotland
 History of Wales

The British Isles also includes three Crown dependencies of the United Kingdom.
 History of Guernsey
 History of Jersey
 History of the Isle of Man

Former political entities 
The following political entities all at one time existed within the British Isles.

Anglo-Saxon kingdoms 
Anglo-Saxons inhabited England from the 5th Century, and formed their own kingdoms.
 Kingdom of East Anglia
 Kingdom of Essex
 Kingdom of Kent
 Kingdom of Mercia
 Kingdom of Northumbria
 Kingdom of Sussex
 Kingdom of Wessex

Irish kingdoms 
 List of Irish kingdoms
Prior to the Norman invasion of Ireland many Irish Kingdoms existed. Some of the larger ones were:
 Kingdom of Connacht
 Kingdom of Leinster
 Kingdom of Meath
 Kingdom of Munster
 Kingdom of Ulster

Kingdoms in Scotland 
The following kingdoms all existed in what is now recognised as Scotland:
 Kingdom of Alba
 Bernicia
 Dál Riata
 Fortriu
 Kingdom of Strathclyde
 Kingdom of the Isles

Welsh kingdoms 
During the medieval era several kingdoms existed in Wales.
 Brycheiniog
 Kingdom of Ceredigion
 Dogfeiling
 Dunoding
 Kingdom of Dyfed
 Glywysing
 Kingdom of Gwent
 Kingdom of Gwynedd
 Meirionnydd
 Pengwern
 Kingdom of Powys
 Rhos (North Wales)

Modern period 
During the modern period the following entities have all existed, but no longer do so.
 Kingdom of England
 Kingdom of Ireland
 Kingdom of Scotland
 Confederate Ireland
 Commonwealth of England
 United Kingdom of Great Britain and Ireland

Time periods

Prehistoric 
 Prehistoric Britain
 Prehistoric Ireland
 Neolithic British Isles

Classical period 
The history of the British Isles in the classical era was characterised by the attempts of the Roman Empire to conquer the islands.
 Roman Britain
 Scotland during the Roman Empire
 Wales in the Roman era

Medieval period 
 England in the Middle Ages
 History of Ireland (800–1169)
 History of Ireland (1169–1536)
 Scotland in the Middle Ages
 Wales in the Middle Ages

Early modern period 
 Early modern Britain
 History of Ireland (1536–1691)
 History of Ireland (1691–1800)

19th Century 
 United Kingdom of Great Britain and Ireland - State as it existed from 1801 to 1922.
 Georgian era
 Regency era
 Victorian era

20th Century to present 
 History of the Republic of Ireland
 History of the United Kingdom

Major events
Throughout history, there have been several events that had a lasting impact on the British Isles as a whole.

Conflicts

Conflicts within the British Isles 

Historically, there have been many conflicts between the people inhabiting the British Isles which led to a lasting impact on the history of the islands.
 Wars of Scottish Independence - A series of conflicts between Scotland and England from 1296 to 1357.
 Wars of the Three Kingdoms - A series of interconnected conflicts within the British Isles from 1639 to 1653.
 Jacobite risings - A series of conflicts over the succession of the British throne from 1689 to 1745.
 Irish War of Independence - A conflict fought between the Irish Republican Army and British forces over the independence of Ireland.

Invasions from outside the British Isles 

There have been several invasions of the British Isles by outside entities, some of which had a lasting impact on the history of the islands.
 Roman conquest of Britain - Roman invasion of Britain starting in 43 AD and largely completed by 87 AD.
 Norman conquest of England - 1066.
 German occupation of the Channel Islands - Occupation of Jersey and Guernsey by German forces from 1940 to 1945.

Political events 
The following events had a lasting impact on the political shape of the British Isles.
 Union of the Crowns - Led to the union of England and Scotland in 1603.
 Acts of Union 1707 - Formed the Parliament of Great Britain by merging the Parliament of Scotland with the Parliament of England.
 Acts of Union 1800 - Formed the Parliament of the United Kingdom by merging the Parliament of Ireland into the Parliament of Great Britain.
 Anglo-Irish Treaty - Formally created the Irish Free State as an independent dominion of the British Empire.

Persons influential in the history of the British Isles

National leaders

Monarchs 
 List of English monarchs - List of English monarchs before the Acts of Union 1707.
 List of Scottish monarchs - List of Scottish monarchs before the Acts of Union 1707.
 List of British monarchs - List of British monarchs following the Acts of Union 1707.

Elected leaders 
 List of presidents of Ireland
 List of prime ministers of the United Kingdom

Timeline 
The following is a timeline showing the major nations within the British Isles, or which controlled parts of the islands, over time.

Miscellaneous 
 Early music of the British Isles
 Genetic history of the British Isles

See also 
 Outline of the Republic of Ireland
 Outline of the United Kingdom

External links 

 British History
 British History at Spartacus Educational
 British History at the BBC
 Eyewitness accounts at mytimemachine.co.uk

History of the British Isles
History of the British Isles